Albert Wills McIntire (January 15, 1853 – January 31, 1935) was an American Republican politician. He was the ninth Governor of Colorado from 1895 to 1897. In 1896 Governor McIntire sent the Colorado National Guard to Leadville due to violence at the Coronado Mine during a strike by the Western Federation of Miners.

Early in 1896, McIntire rejected a last-minute insanity defense appeal of the Park County rancher Benjamin Ratcliff, who murdered three members of his local school board with whom he had quarreled over the education of this three children. After McIntire refused to intervene, Ratcliff was hanged at the Colorado State Penitentiary at Cañon City. He claimed that he had committed the murders to uphold the honorable reputation of his family.

References

Governor Albert W. McIntire Collection at the Colorado State Archives Retrieved on 18 April 2008.

External links

1853 births
1935 deaths
Republican Party governors of Colorado
Politicians from Pittsburgh